Biatorbágyi Sport Egyesület is a professional football club based in Biatorbágy, Pest County, Hungary. The club competes in the Pest county league.

Name changes
1903: establishment
1962: fusion of Biai SE and Torbágyi KSK 
1962-1989: Biatorbágyi SE
1989–present: Viadukt SE Biatorbágy

External links
 Profile on Magyar Futball

References

Football clubs in Hungary
Association football clubs established in 1903
1903 establishments in Hungary